Khoiyachora Waterfall is a hilly waterfall which is situated on the hills of Mirsharai, Chittagong, Bangladesh . Among many other waterfalls in Mirsarai upazila, such as Komoldoho Waterfall, Napittachora Waterfall, Napittachora Waterfall, Sahasradhara Waterfall, Jharjhari Waterfall etc., Khoiyachora waterfall and its corridor is one of the largest in this hilly belt. The Khoiyachora waterfall has a total of seven major waterfalls (cascade) and many isolated steps. Since the location of the fountain is in Khoiyachora union of Mirsarai Upazila, the waterfall has been named "Khoiyachora Waterfall".

Location
Dhaka-Chittagong highway on the north side of the Baratakia market at the  Khoiyachora Union of Mirsharai Upazila. The location of the water is 4.2 kilometers east of it. Due to the location of the fountain is in the mountains, it is not possible to reach at the top of the fountain directly by using any vehicle. It is possible to reach the village near the fountain using the Dhaka-Chittagong highway or on foot from the side or using local vehicles (e.g. CNG). But there is no arrangement for the rest of the road to reach the main stream of the fountain in the foothills of the hill, it is possible to reach there on foot only.

History
It is believed that the Khoiyachora Waterfalls, which is flowing almost 50 years ago. It took time to discover its location for massless mountain areas and bushes. Again many people think that this fountain was created due to hilly diversions almost 50 years ago, before that there was no waterfall.

In 2010, the Government has been included in the Khoiyachora Waterfall National Park, after declaring 293.61 hectares of the block of Kunda Hat (Baratakia) block in the Baraiyadhala Block National Park.

On behalf of the Government of the People's Republic of Bangladesh in 2017, the eco-tourism development project has been undertaken by the Department of Forest Department of Chittagong, "Ramgarh-Sitakunda-Reserve Forest", Khoiyachora Fountain, one of the main objectives is the conservation of the Khoiyachora Waterfall.

Gallery

References

Waterfalls of Bangladesh
Chittagong Division